Eduardo Luis Iachetti (born February 10, 1975 in Cipolletti, Río Negro Province) is an Argentine former football striker.

In his native country he played for first division clubs Colón and San Martín de Mendoza. He also spent some years in the Argentine Nacional B playing for teams such as Olimpo de Bahía Blanca and Unión de Santa Fe. Moreover, he made spells in the Serie A de Ecuador for clubs Olmedo and Deportivo Cuenca, the second one for which he played in Copa Libertadores. In addition, he saw some action in the Liga de Fútbol Profesional Boliviano with two spells at Club Blooming. In 2006 while playing for San Martín de Mendoza on his second stint, Iachetti retired from football as result of a knee injury he could not recovered from.

References

External links
 Argentine Primera statistics  
 

1975 births
Living people
People from Cipolletti
Argentine footballers
Association football midfielders
Club Atlético Colón footballers
Olimpo footballers
Club Blooming players
C.D. Cuenca footballers
Argentine expatriate sportspeople in Ecuador
Unión de Santa Fe footballers
Expatriate footballers in Bolivia
Expatriate footballers in Ecuador
Argentine expatriate sportspeople in Bolivia